Holyfield is a surname. Notable people with the surname include:

Elijah Holyfield (born 1998), American football player
Evander Holyfield (born 1962), American world champion heavyweight boxer
Michael Holyfield (born 1992), American basketball player
Wayland Holyfield (born 1942), American songwriter

English-language surnames